Maria Emo is an Austrian stage, film and television actor. She is the daughter of the actress Anita Dorris and the director E. W. Emo.

While she has mostly concentrated on the theatre her notable film roles include playing Eva Braun in the 1962 film Hitler.

Selected filmography
 Bel Ami (1955)
 Marriage Sanitarium (1955)
 The Girl from the Marsh Croft (1958)
 Herr Puntila and His Servant Matti (1960)
 Hitler (1962)
 Der Weibsteufel (1966)
 Der stille Ozean (1983)

References

External links

1936 births
Living people
Austrian film actresses
Austrian stage actresses
Austrian television actresses
20th-century Austrian actresses